Heidesheim am Rhein is a former Verbandsgemeinde ("collective municipality") in the district Mainz-Bingen in Rhineland-Palatinate, Germany. The seat of the Verbandsgemeinde was in Heidesheim am Rhein. In 2010 a reform of the communal structure was requested by the Rhineland-Palatinate government. As a result of this on 1 July 2019  Wackernheim and Heidesheim were incorporated into the city of Ingelheim.

The Verbandsgemeinde Heidesheim am Rhein consisted of the following Ortsgemeinden ("local municipalities"):

 Heidesheim am Rhein
 Wackernheim

References

Former Verbandsgemeinden in Rhineland-Palatinate